The following is a list of telenovelas produced and broadcast by RecordTV.

1950s

1960s

1970s

1990s

2000s

2010s

2020s

See also 
 RecordTV

References 

Lists of telenovelas
 
Brazilian television-related lists